Renato Gaeta (born 24 April 1959) is an Italian rower. He competed at the 1984 Summer Olympics and the 1988 Summer Olympics.

References

1959 births
Living people
Italian male rowers
Olympic rowers of Italy
Rowers at the 1984 Summer Olympics
Rowers at the 1988 Summer Olympics
Place of birth missing (living people)